Manilkara jaimiqui, commonly known as wild dilly, is a woody plant in the sapodilla family. It is native to tropical regions of North America, where it is found in the West Indies and south Florida. Its natural habitat is areas of coastal hammocks and pine rocklands.

It is a small tree or shrub with thick evergreen leaves. It produces small yellow flowers throughout the year, and has large scaly fruits.

This species is divided into four well-marked subspecies, which show little geographic overlap. They are:
M. jaimiqui ssp. emarginata - The Bahamas and south Florida
M. jaimiqui ssp. haitensis - Dominican Republic and Haiti
M. jaimiqui ssp. jaimiqui - Cuba (Pinar del Río and Oriente), and Jamaica
M. jaimiqui ssp. wrightiana - Cuba (central area, occasionally in Oriente)

References

jaimiqui